Bonds House can refer to:

 Bonds House (Fox, Arkansas), listed on the National Register of Historic Places (NRHP) in Stone County, Arkansas
 Bonds House (Humboldt, Tennessee), listed on the NRHP in Gibson County, Tennessee